Anthony Alexis Sosa Martínez (born 27 July 1996) is a Uruguayan footballer who plays as a midfielder for Uruguayan Primera División club C.A. Progreso.

References

External links
Profile at Sofa Score

1996 births
Living people
Uruguayan footballers
Uruguayan expatriate footballers
Montevideo City Torque players
C.A. Progreso players
C.D. Nacional players
Uruguayan Primera División players
Uruguayan Segunda División players
Association football midfielders
Uruguayan expatriate sportspeople in Portugal
Expatriate footballers in Portugal